A Regular Fellow may refer to one of several films:

 A Regular Fellow, 1919 silent American film directed by Christy Cabanne
 A Regular Fellow, 1925 silent American film directed by A. Edward Sutherland